Below are the squads of the teams that participated in the 2004 Copa América.

Group A

Bolivia

Head coach: Ramiro Blacut

Colombia

Head coach: Reinaldo Rueda

Peru

Head coach:  Paulo Autuori

Venezuela

Head coach: Richard Páez

Group B

Argentina

Head coach: Marcelo Bielsa

Ecuador

Head coach:  Hernán Darío Gómez

Mexico

Head coach:  Ricardo La Volpe

Uruguay

Head coach: Jorge Fossati

 * Replaced Fabián Carini due to injury.

Group C

Brazil

Head coach: Carlos Alberto Parreira

Chile

Head coach: Juvenal Olmos

Costa Rica

Head coach:  Jorge Luis Pinto

Paraguay

Head coach: Carlos Jara Saguier

References
RSSSF

2004 Copa América
Copa América squads